French Village is an unincorporated community in eastern St. Francois County, Missouri, United States. It is located approximately ten miles east of Bonne Terre and has a population of 1,226. The ZIP Code for French Village is 63036.

History
French Village was founded in the 1820s by a colony of French Canadians. A post office called French Village has been in operation since 1857.

References

Unincorporated communities in St. Francois County, Missouri
Unincorporated communities in Missouri
1820s establishments in Missouri